The Tarocco Piemontese (Tarot of Piedmont) is a type of tarot deck of Italian origin. It is the most common tarot playing set in northern Italy, much more common than the Tarocco Bolognese. The most popular Piedmontese tarot games are Scarto, Mitigati, Chiamare il Re, and Partita which are played in Pinerolo and Turin. This deck is considered part of Piedmontese culture and appeared in the 2006 Winter Olympics closing ceremony held in Turin. As this was the standard tarot pack of the Kingdom of Sardinia, it was also formerly used in Savoy and Nice before their annexation by France. Additionally, it was used as an alternative to the Tarocco Siciliano in Calatafimi-Segesta, Sicily. Outside of Italy, it is used by a small number of players in Ticino, Switzerland and was used by Italian Argentines.

This deck is not related to the non-tarot Piemontesi deck which uses French-suited hearts, diamonds, spades, and clubs. As such, their cards are not interchangeable.

Composition
This deck pattern was derived from the Tarot of Marseilles but was made reversible for modern game playing. It consists of 78 cards: a trump suit of 22 cards, numbered from 0 to 21, and four 14-card suits of swords (spade), batons (bastoni), cups (coppe), and coins (denari). Each suit has a king (re), queen (donna), knight (cavallo) and jack (unlabelled), pip cards numbered from 2 to 10, and an unnumbered card with an elaborate suit symbol which acts as the ace. Trumps and most pip cards have indices in modern Arabic numerals (for trumps, cups, and coins) or Roman numerals (for swords and batons). Unusually, in most games trump 20 outranks trump 21 (this may have been influenced by Bolognese games).

The order of the trumps, in most games played with this pack, is:  
the Angel "l'angelo" (20), 
the World "il mondo" (21), 
the Sun "il sole" (19), 
the Moon "la luna" (18), 
the Star "le stelle" (17), 
the Tower "la torre" (16), 
the Devil "il diavolo" (15), 
Temperance "la temperenza" (14), 
Death "la morte" (13), 
the Hanged Man "l'appeso" (12), 
Strength "la forza" (11), 
the Wheel of Fortune "rota di fortuna" (10), 
the Hermit "l'eremita" (9), 
Justice "la giustizia" (8), 
the Chariot "il carro" (7), 
the Lovers "gli amanti" (6), 
the Pope "il papa" (5), 
the Emperor "l'imperatore" (4), 
the Empress "l'imperatrice" (3), 
the Popess "la papessa" (2), 
and the Pagat "il bagatto" (1).

The Fool "il matto" (0) is played as an excuse: it can beat nothing, but can always be played to a trick, relieving the holder from the obligation to follow suit. In only two games recorded in the 18th and 19th centuries is the Fool treated as the lowest trump.

Like in most tarot games outside of France and Sicily, the order of the cards in swords and batons is king, queen, knight, jack, X, IX, ... I, while in the ranking of the cards in cups and coins is king, queen, knight, jack, 1, 2, ... 10.

History

Tarot decks were in production in Pinerolo by 1505. The best description of 16th century Piedmontese tarot is by Francesco Piscina who wrote a discourse about it in Mondovì in 1565. Although his details about the game are sparse, his terminology strongly implies Bolognese and Florentine influence. Like in tarocchini, he treats the imperial and papal trumps as equals, a feature which still survives in Asti. Like in Bologna, the highest trump is the Angel which outranks the World. Excluding Piedicavallo, Piedmontese players persist in ranking the Angel as higher than the World despite their modern numbering. In addition, some players remove the lower ranking pip cards to create a 62-card deck like in Bologna; others go further to make a 54-card deck like in Cego. How Piscina ranked his trumps is very similar to two other 16th century lists from Lombardy. All three lists are similar to the ranking of a sole surviving deck produced by Jacques Viéville of Paris around 1650, which has features found in Bolognese, Florentine, and Ferrarese tarots. This has led to speculation that players from Northwest Italy may have used decks similar to Viéville's until around 1700 when economic collapse drove regional cardmakers out of business. As no cards before this period survive, this theory cannot by substantiated.

After the collapse, players resorted to importing the Tarot of Marseilles from France. When production resumed around 1735, the cards were almost identical to the Marseilles pattern, including the French captions. Efforts to localize the cards began in the early 19th century eventually resulting in the double-ended cards of today by the end of that century. After Savoy and Nice were annexed by France, players there continued using this deck until 1900 when the Tarot Nouveau began to spread across the country. At the beginning of the 20th century, there was an effort to create a competing deck in Chambéry using the Piedmontese version of the Paris pattern as the base for a new tarot pack, but ultimately proved unsuccessful. Reproductions of this pack have been made since 1984.

References

Tarot playing card decks